Mejorada Fútbol Sala was a futsal club based in Mejorada del Campo, Community of Madrid. The club also was known as Algon FS.

History
Mejorada Fútbol Sala was founded in 1983 as Club Deportivo Algon Fútbol Sala. In 1992, the club was moved from Arganda de Rey to Mejorada del Campo. In 1996, the club was dissolved due large debts.

Season to season

7 seasons in División de Honor

Trophies
División de Honor: 0
Semifinals: 1990–91, 1994–95
Copa de España: 0
Semifinals: 1993–94

Famous players
  Daniel Ibañes
 Javier Lozano

References

Futsal clubs in Spain
Sports teams in the Community of Madrid
Futsal clubs established in 1983
Sports clubs disestablished in 1996
1983 establishments in Spain
1996 disestablishments in Spain